was a district located in Gifu Prefecture, Japan. The district was dissolved on February 1, 2005, when the town and village in the district merged into the expanded city of Takayama.

As of 2003, the district had an estimated population of 11,938 and a density of 21.16 persons per km2. The total area was 564.17 km2.

District Timeline
On February 1, 2004, the towns of Furukawa and Kamioka and the villages of Kawai and Miyagawa merged to form the city of Hida.

On February 1, 2005, the following town and village in the district, before merging in Takayama, were:
 Kamitakara
 Kokufu

References

Former districts of Gifu Prefecture